Zygmunt Zaleski of Lubicz coat of arms (29 September 1882 in Kłonowiec-Koracz near the Kielce, Poland – 15 December 1967 in Paris, France), pseudonymes R. de Bron, R. Debron, was a Polish literature historian, literary critic, poet, publicist, and translator. Awarded the Légion d'honneur.

Zaleski was an editor of Polak, magazine of Polish Army in France (1918–1919). He was a co-editor of Collection Polonaise, a series of French language translations of Polish literature. Awarded the Golden Laurel of Polish Academy of Literature (Złoty Wawrzyn Polskiej Akademii Literatury; 1938). He was also an editor of Życie Sztuki (1935–1939).

Notable works
  (1912)
  (1913)
  (1914) – collection of poems
  (Paris, 1929)
  (Paris, 1932)
  (1932) – drama
  (Hannover, 1946) – poetic prose
  (Aix en Provence, 1969) – collection of works published posthumously

References
 
 

1882 births
1967 deaths
Grand Officiers of the Légion d'honneur
20th-century Polish historians
Polish male non-fiction writers
Polish literary critics
20th-century Polish poets
Polish publicists
Polish translators
Translators from Polish
Translators to French
Polish–French translators
Golden Laurel of the Polish Academy of Literature
20th-century translators
Polish male poets
20th-century male writers

Commanders with Star of the Order of Polonia Restituta
Officers of the Order of Polonia Restituta
Recipients of the Ordre des Palmes Académiques
Polish emigrants to France